A statue of Miguel Hidalgo y Costilla is installed in front of the Legislative Palace of Guadalajara, in the Mexican state of Jalisco. Hidalgo y Costilla is depicted enraged, breaking chains of slavery and urging for freedom. It was unveiled in 1952 along with the Plaza de la Liberación.

References

External links

 

1952 establishments in Mexico
1952 sculptures
Bronze sculptures in Mexico
Monuments and memorials in Jalisco
Outdoor sculptures in Guadalajara
Sculptures of men in Mexico
Statues in Jalisco